P. Raju (born 18 July 1951) is an Indian politician of the Communist Party of India. He represented Paravur constituency in 9th KLA and 10th KLA. 
 Currently he is the secretary of CPI Ernakulam District Council.

References

Communist Party of India politicians from Kerala
Living people
1951 births